Ahmed Said or Ahmad Said may refer to:

Ahmad Said (politician), Malay politician and member of the Legislative Assembly
Ahmed Hassan Said, Egyptian businessman
Ahmed Said (cricketer), Pakistani cricketer
Ahmed Said (footballer), Egyptian football player
Ahmed Said (swimmer), Egyptian swimmer
Ahmed Said (broadcaster), director and announcer of Voice of the Arabs, 1953-1967
Ahmed Hassan Said, Egyptian politician
Ahmed Said Musa Patel, first Imam and Muslim cleric in New Zealand

See also
Ahmed Saad (disambiguation)
Abdulkadir Ahmed Said, Somali film director, producer, screenwriter, cinematographer and editor
Djaffar Ahmed Said, administrator in Comoros
Mohammed Ahmed Said Haidel, citizen of Yemen, who was held in extrajudicial detention in the United States Guantanamo Bay detention camps, in Cuba
Said Ahmed Said, Ghanaian-Italian football player